Woden Park (also known as Woden Park Athletics Field) is a multi-use association football stadium and athletics centre located within Woden Valley, Canberra. It is the home ground of Woden Weston FC in the NPL Capital Football as well as ACT Little Athletics.

Stadium Facilities

Following the completion of the redevelopment, Woden Park is now a disabled friendly venue with the provision of a disability access ramp. The facilities are now at a level capable enough to host national football and athletics events. The other facility upgrades are listed below.

References:

Football

 New re-laid 100m x 64m football pitch

Athletics

 New 400m synthetic running track
 New ‘photo finish’ building
 New jumping pits
 New throwing cages

Shared

 New national level floodlighting for entire complex
 New amenities building
 New security fencing
 New Internal car park
 Upgrade to existing pavilion
 Upgrade to canteen facilities
 Upgrade to office space
 Upgrade to toilets
 Upgrade to storage

Primary Use

Woden Weston FC and ACT Little Athletics are the joint primary tenants of Woden Park. Woden Weston FC play home matches in the National Premier Leagues Capital Football at the stadium as well Capital Football Federation Cup matches. ACT Little Athletics runs its programs for kids aged 6 to 17 in a variety of track and field athletic sports.

Events History

Redevelopment Grand opening

14 February 2015, after completion of the $7 million redevelopment, Woden Park was officially opened by ACT Sports Minister, Greens MLA Shane Rattenbury. The itinerary for the grand opening included an exhibition football match and athletics all-comers meet for kids aged six to ten before ending with an athletics meet for all-comers aged eleven and over. All participants received commemorative ribbons.

Inaugural Woden-Weston FC match

24 April 2015, Woden-Weston played their inaugural home match at Woden Park against Tuggeranong United in what was billed as the Southside derby. Under the flood-lights the Woden-Weston boys secured an historic first victory for the club in a crushing 4–0 victory. Both Pepe Varga and Tim Anderson scored braces in the match. The win not only got the club off the foot of the table but it enabled the players to lift the newly created Mount Taylor Cup that is given to the derby victors. This was the beginning of a healthy rivalry between the two clubs in the NPL Capital Football league.

A-League pre-season friendlies

Woden Park has hosted pre-season matches involving A-League opposition. The below table details these matches:

Records

Coming Soon*

References

External links

 Woden Park home
 ACT Little Athletics home
 Woden Weston FC home
 NPL ACT home
 Capital Football home

1973 establishments in Australia
Sports venues completed in 1973
Sports venues in Canberra
Soccer venues in Canberra
Athletics (track and field) venues in Australia